Utricularia uliginosa, the Asian bladderwort, is a small annual carnivorous plant that belongs to the genus Utricularia. It is native to Southeast Asia (Borneo, Burma, Cambodia, China, India, Japan, Java, Korea, Peninsular Malaysia, Sri Lanka, Sumatra, Taiwan, Thailand, and Vietnam), Oceania (Guam, New Caledonia, New Guinea, and Palau), and Australia (New South Wales, the Northern Territory, Queensland, and Western Australia). U. uliginosa grows as a terrestrial or subaquatic plant in seasonally flooded shallow pools with sandy soils or on banks and among rocky stream beds at low altitudes. It was originally described by Martin Vahl in 1804.

Synonyms 
U. affinis Wight
U. affinis var. griffithii (Wight) Oliv. ex C.B.Clarke
U. brachypoda Wight
[U. caerulea Benth.]
U. caerulea var. affinis (Wight) Thwaites
U. cyanea R.Br.
U. decipiens Dalzell
U. elachista Goebel
[U. graminifolia R.Br.]
U. graminifolia Banks & Sol. ex Oliv.
U. griffithii Wight
U. intricata Griffith ex Oliv.
U. lilacina Griffith
U. macrophylla Masam. & Syozi
U. nayarii Janarth.
[U. reticulata var. stricticaulis Koenig ex Oliv.]
U. reticulata var. uliginosa (Vahl) C.B.Clarke
U. yakusimensis Masam.

See also 

 List of Utricularia species

References 

uliginosa
Carnivorous plants of Asia
Carnivorous plants of Australia
Carnivorous plants of the Pacific
Flora of China
Flora of Guam
Flora of Japan
Flora of Korea
Flora of New Caledonia
Flora of New South Wales
Flora of Palau
Flora of Queensland
Flora of Taiwan
Flora of tropical Asia
Flora of the Northern Territory
Eudicots of Western Australia
Lamiales of Australia
Taxa named by Martin Vahl
Plants described in 1804
Flora without expected TNC conservation status